Luisa Manon Porritt (born 23 May 1987) is a British Liberal Democrat politician. She served as a Member of the European Parliament (MEP) for London from 2019 to 2020. She was the party's candidate for the 2021 London mayoral election, though she failed to achieve more than 5% of the vote and lost her deposit.

Early life and education 
Luisa Manon Porritt was born at the Royal Free Hospital on 23 May 1987. She grew up in Camden and was educated at a local private school. She earned a degree in history from Royal Holloway, University of London in 2008 and went on to complete a Master's degree at Sciences Po Paris.

Career 
Before her political career, Porritt worked as a journalist, a consultant for strategic advisory firm Global Counsel, and a political researcher and advisor for Shriti Vadera. In 2021, Porritt became Head of Investment Content at PR firm Edelman Smithfield.

Political career 
Porritt joined the Liberal Democrats a few days after the UK voted to leave the European Union in 2016. She became a Liberal Democrat councillor for the London Borough of Camden in 2018. She gained a seat for the marginal council ward of Belsize from the Conservative incumbent by nine votes, following a recount. She became leader of the small Liberal Democrat group of 3 on Camden council on 7 September 2020.

In the 2019 European Parliament election, she was third on the Liberal Democrat list for the London constituency. The Liberal Democrats won 27% of the vote, winning three seats, so Porritt was elected as a Member of the European Parliament. She was appointed deputy leader of the Liberal Democrat group in the European Parliament. During her time as an MEP, Porritt brought resolutions calling on Iran to release Nazanin Zaghari-Ratcliffe.

Porritt was reported to be “seriously considering” putting her name forward to be the Liberal Democrat candidate in the 2021 London mayoral election after Siobhan Benita withdrew from the race following its postponement from the original May 2020 date. She won the selection against the option to reopen nominations on 13 October 2020 after the other shortlisted candidate, Geeta Sidhu-Robb, was suspended from the Liberal Democrats following antisemitism.

Porritt called for empty offices to be turned into affordable housing, and reform of stop and search. She has been critical of the government's handling of coronavirus, calling for a circuit breaker lockdown when London was put into Tier 2 restrictions in October 2020, and Sadiq Khan's negotiations on the future of Transport For London.

Porritt placed fourth in the election, failing to achieve 5% of the vote and therefore losing her deposit. Porritt came third in her own council ward Belsize on 209 votes to Labour's Sadiq Khan's 986 and the Conservatives' 477.

In August 2021, Porritt abstained on a vote on the controversial Haverstock Hill cycle lane in her own ward, which was ultimately supported by the council.

Porritt stood down as a Camden councillor at the 2022 Camden London Borough Council election, citing work commitments.

Personal life 
Porritt is of Jewish, Spanish, Turkish, Egyptian and Austro-Hungarian descent.

References

External links
Luisa Porritt for Mayor of London – campaign website
Luisa Porritt at the European Parliament
 Twitter
 Facebook
 Instagram

1987 births
Living people
English people of Egyptian-Jewish descent
English people of Spanish-Jewish descent
English people of Turkish-Jewish descent
Liberal Democrats (UK) MEPs
MEPs for England 2019–2020
21st-century women MEPs for England
Alumni of Royal Holloway, University of London
Sciences Po alumni
Councillors in the London Borough of Camden